José Antonio Sistiaga (4 May 1932, San Sebastián, Spain) is a Spanish Basque artist and experimental filmmaker best known for his feature-length hand-painted "direct" film, ... era erera baleibu izik subua aruaren ... (1968–70). He lives in Ciboure (France) and works in San Sebastian (Spain).

Early works 

During the Spanish Civil War, as a son of a republican Basque, José Antonio Sistiaga had to escape from Bilbao with part of his family to Bordeaux (France) after the bombing of Guernica in April 1937. In 1955, he settled in Paris where he met the Andalusian painter Manuel Duque, executed his first paintings in Paris, in the context of the Informal painting movement. His early works (black paintings) date from 1959: abstract, non-geometrical, they could be compared to Henri Michaux's or Jean Fautrier's works, despite the fact that Sistiaga never heard about these artists at this moment. 

Back in Basque Country, Sistiaga met the sculptor Jorge Oteiza. In 1963 he created a workshop for  free expression dedicated to children, influenced by alternative pedagogic method of Celestin Freynet ; he collaborated in that direction with artist Esther Ferrer for a project based in Elorrio. During these years (60's) Sistiaga had a real interdisciplinary artistic strategy and interest between alternative teaching, performances, contemporary music and cinema. In 1966, he formed along with other Basque artists the influential avant-garde group Gaur. This collective gathered the following artists: Jorge Oteiza, Rafael Ruiz Balerdi, Eduardo Chillida, Remigio Mendiburu, Néstor Basterretxea, Amable Arias, José Luis Zumeta and José Antonio Sistiaga. Sistiaga focused his pictorical and graphic works on energy, movement, gesture: his works on canvas or paper seem to be seismographs of sensibilities and emotions.

Alternative teachings, conferences and performances 

Sistiaga discovered in Paris the artistic alternative workshop dedicated to children created by Arno Stern: L'Académie des jeudis. Stern searched to reveal the original creativity of the children, far from the artistic education. Sistiaga will create similar workshops when he will be back in Spain (San Sebastian) with the help of artist Esther Ferrer: La Academia de los jueves, which will be active from 1963 to 1968. In Parallel, he was in touch with Celestin Freinet, who created the Methode Freinet of teaching, based on development of the child from his own capacities. Sistiaga organized exhibitions of children creations in the Basque Country, sometimes with his own works

Experimental cinema

After seeing in Paris a Norman Mac Laren's film, he decided to improve this medium to pass over his pictorial strategies.  He exhibited his first film in 1968 at the Bilbao Short Film Festival. Titled ... era erera baleibu izik subua aruaren ... (a nonsense phrase coined by Sistiaga's friend Rafa Ruiz Balerdi), it won a prize for best experimental film. This 10-minute short, hand-painted in a fairly conventional cartoon style, was later renamed De la Luna a Euskadi ("From the Moon to the Basque Country").

Thanks to the help of collector and patron from Navarra Juan Huarte, who created a film production company X-Films to produce films made by basque artists from the Gaur Movement (Balerdi, Basterretxea, Sistiaga), the artist began painting his abstract magnum opus in 1968. It took 17 months of 10- to 12-hour days to complete. The silent, 75-minute ... era erera baleibu izik subua aruaren ... was first exhibited at Madrid in 1970. The technique is hand painted film. Sistiaga used the same vocabulary of his paintings (lines, points, colour) onto the film celluloid and obtained random patterns of colored points that evokes the atomic matter or the "Primitive soup" of universe. Subsequent screenings took place in London, Paris, Barcelona and New York City.

Each of the approximately 108,000 frames in ... era erera is completely unique, and appears onscreen for only 1/24th of a second. No optical printing techniques or special photographic effects were employed in its production.... era erera baleibu izik subua aruaren ... is the first feature-length example of "direct" cameraless filmmaking, a painstaking technique dating back to the early 1900s. Other well-known artists in the genre include Len Lye, Harry Smith, Norman McLaren (whose work Sistiaga cites as a direct influence) and Stan Brakhage.

In 1972, José Antonio Sistiaga participated to the International Art Event Encuentros de Pamplona with painting and his films. Juan Huarte (patron of the event) commissioned him to shoot a film on the event where participated American composer John Cage, Steve Reich and European ones Luc Ferrari and José Luis Isasa. During this period, Sistiaga painted large paintings with curves, lines on white canvas

Later hand-painted films and recent paintings 

In 1988-89, Sistiaga painted a new direct film Impresiones en la alta atmósfera ("Impressions from the Upper Atmosphere") in 70mm 15-perf horizontal format, intended for exhibition in giant-screen IMAX and Omnimax theaters.

From the middle of 90's, the artist got a generous space in Antiguo district (in San Sebastian), allowing the artist to produce his huger canvas : Cosmos Oceano, The Four Seasons, Maurice Ravel's tribute are some of them.

Two additional 35mm films using a different technique, filming hand painting transparents,  Paisaje inquietante Nocturno ("Disturbing Nocturnal Landscape") and En un jardin imaginado ("In an Imaginary Garden"), were completed in 1991.

Since then, Sistiaga began working on a new film onto 70 mm celluloid with IMAX format : Han. Sobre el sol. Still unfinished ( only 2 minutes have been released), this film explores the cosmic iconography of stars and galaxies ; with this aim, the artist used two animation techniques : "direct film" (hand painted film) and animation frame after frame for fixing in the frame a form.

Painterly and cinematic processes nourish each other in Sistiaga's works. The artist has been working since 2011 on a new typology of paintings on board, following Jackson Pollock's dripping technique ; this series is composed of two sorts of works: first, those which get the impact of the gesture on the board surface and, second, those which collect splatters or splashes from a distance. This strategy which aims at collecting on the surface traces of vital energy, has links with alchemical processes or for example interest of artists for magnetism and all other emanations of invisible .

His films are part of permanent collections of eminent museums in the world : Centre Pompidou, Musée national d'art moderne (Paris) and Museo de arte Reina Sofia in Madrid. You can see Sistiaga's paintings at the Museo de bellas artes in Bilbao, at the Museo San Telmo in San Sebastian or at the Museo nacional Centro de arte Reina Sofia in Madrid.

Filmography 

 ... era erera baleibu izik subua aruaren ... (retitled De la Luna a Euskadi) (1968) (35mm, silent, 8 minutes)
 ... era erera baleibu izik subua aruaren ... (1968–70) (35mm, silent, 75 minutes)
 Ana (1970) (16mm, sound, 7 minutes)
 Laztanak (1970) (16mm, 85 minutes)
 Encuentros 1972, Pamplona (1972) (16mm, silent)
 Impresiones en la alta atmósfera (1988–89) (70mm 15-perf, sound, 7 minutes)
 Paisaje inquietante Nocturno (1991) (35mm, sound, 14 minutes)
 En un jardin imaginado (1991) (35mm, sound, 14 minutes)
 Han (sobre el sol) (1992; in progress) (70mm 15-perf, sound, actually 2 minutes)

Films on José Antonio Sistiaga
 Sistiaga. A Basque Story. directed and produced by Manuel Sorto. 2014. 100 min.

Bibliography 

 

 

 

 

 

 

 

 
Ciboure, repaire d'artistes ; Ziburu, artisten ohanttze bat, Jean Paul Goikoetxea, 1995, ed. Couleurs du sud (épuisé) ; Prix Maurice Ravel et Médaille de la ville de Ciboure - 2e édition, 2008, ed. Sarea.

References

1932 births
Spanish experimental filmmakers
Visual music artists
Living people
People from San Sebastián
Film directors from the Basque Country (autonomous community)
Basque artists
Spanish male painters
Exiles of the Spanish Civil War in France